Pablo Jaime Galimberti di Vietri  (born 8 May 1941 in Montevideo) is a Uruguayan Roman Catholic cleric.

Ordained 29 May 1971, he was appointed Bishop of San José on 12 December 1983. Later he was appointed Bishop of Salto on 16 May 2006.  He retired on 24 July 2018.

References

External links

1942 births
Uruguayan people of Italian descent
People from Montevideo
Pontifical Gregorian University alumni
Uruguayan theologians
Bishops appointed by Pope John Paul II
20th-century Roman Catholic bishops in Uruguay
21st-century Roman Catholic bishops in Uruguay
Living people
Uruguayan Roman Catholic bishops
Roman Catholic bishops of Salto
Roman Catholic bishops of San José de Mayo